Ronald Graafland (born 30 April 1979 in Rotterdam) is a retired Dutch footballer who played for Feyenoord, Excelsior, Vitesse and Ajax.

Honours

Club
Feyenoord
 Eredivisie (1): 1998–99

References

External links
 Voetbal International profile 

1979 births
Living people
Dutch footballers
SBV Vitesse players
Excelsior Rotterdam players
Feyenoord players
AFC Ajax players
Eredivisie players
Eerste Divisie players
Footballers from Rotterdam
Association football goalkeepers